Wikimedia Enterprise is a commercial product by the Wikimedia Foundation to provide, in a more easily consumable way, the data of the Wikimedia projects, including Wikipedia. It allows customers to retrieve data at large scale and high availability through different formats like Web APIs, data snapshots or streams. 
It was first announced in March 2021 and launched on October 26, 2021.

Google and Internet Archive were its first customers, although Internet Archive is not paying for the product.

References

External links

Enterprise
Commercial use of Wikimedia projects